The Canada Southern Railway , also known as CSR, was a railway in southwestern Ontario, Canada, founded on February 28, 1868 as the Erie and Niagara Extension Railway. Its name was changed to Canada Southern Railway on December 24, 1869.

The railway was leased to the Michigan Central Railroad (MCR) for 99 years in 1883; in 1929 it was subleased to the New York Central Railroad (NYC). Its successors Penn Central (formed 1968) and Conrail (formed 1976) later exercised control before being sold to CN/CP in 1985.

History

Background

The line was originally conceived by Kenyon Cox (brother of Jacob Dolson Cox, Governor of Ohio), Daniel Drew, Sidney Dillon and John F. Tracy to connect with the Wabash Railroad and establish a railway network extending from Lake Erie to the Mississippi River.

The Panic of 1873 was responsible for the failure of several large railroads in North America, together with their financial backers. In addition to the CSR, the Missouri, Kansas & Texas Railroad, Northern Pacific Railroad, Chesapeake & Ohio Railroad and New York and Oswego Midland Railroad were also affected.

The CSR's banker, Kenyon, Cox & Co. (of which Drew was general partner) failed, and its bonds were subsequently protested, although some observers felt that the move was unnecessary. CSR subsequently became insolvent, as it was unable to redeem the bonds. Within two years, it was taken over by the railroad magnate Cornelius Vanderbilt at essentially no cost other than taking on the guarantee of them.

When Cornelius died in 1877, his son, William Henry Vanderbilt, became head of the Vanderbilt railroad empire. The younger Vanderbilt took steps to separate the various railroad properties he controlled. On 1 January 1883, the New York Central Railroad (NYC) was able to lease the CSR to another Vanderbilt railroad company, the Michigan Central Railroad (MCR), on a 21-year renewable term. Vanderbilt, who owned all three companies, ensured that each one operated independently, through its own autonomous president and board of directors. In 1929, MCR subleased CSR to NYC, its parent company.

Development of the line

The company was originally authorized to construct a railway line between Fort Erie and Sandwich (Windsor), with a branch line to Amherstburg. A second branch line was authorized in 1869 between St. Thomas and Sombra the following year. Other significant subsequent legislation included:

There was an attempt in 1883 to amalgamate the CSR with the Credit Valley Railway, which was dropped when the CVR opted to merge with the Ontario and Quebec Railway instead.

Corporate headquarters

CSR's headquarters were located in St. Thomas, Ontario. The site was chosen because St Thomas was roughly equal-distance between Windsor and Fort Erie, Ontario and the city offered a $25,000 bonus to the railroad company as an incentive to build within city limits. CSR's main building, the Canada Southern Railway Station, included a passenger station and dining room on the ground floor with the railway's head offices on the upper floor. The extremely long, narrow building was based on Italianate architecture and is the only known train station in Canada to embody this style. The station was the design of Canadian architect Edgar Berryman (1839-1905).

Car shops and locomotive manufacturing

A large car shop, located in the yard, facilitated the manufacture of cars and allowed repairs to be made to locomotives. Steam locomotives were also manufactured for CSR in the car shop, beginning in 1882 and closed sometime after 1905. Types of locomotives made included:

 B-82b Class - Type 0-6-0
 B-82d Class - Type 0-6-0
 B-84  Class - Type 0-6-0
 B-84b Class - Type 0-6-0
 F-81c Class - Type 4-6-0
 F-82f Class - Type 4-6-0
 F-82  Class - Type 4-6-0
 F-82a Class - Type 4-6-0
 G-80e Class - Type 2-8-0

Initially all locomotives were built for use by CASO, but some ended their career with the New York Central Railroad.

Later years

The CSR was never completely controlled by the New York Central (later part of Penn Central) or the Michigan Central, as the two together held only about 107,000 of the 150,000 shares outstanding, and the rest were publicly held. The shareholders had received dividends in every year from 1887, and an extraordinary dividend in 1976 triggered a legal dispute that was not resolved until 1983.

On April 30, 1985, the Canadian National Railway and Canadian Pacific Railway jointly purchased the former CASO from Conrail in order to acquire the Michigan Central Railway Tunnel under the Detroit River and the Michigan Central Railway Bridge at Niagara Falls.

Much of the CASO has been downgraded, abandoned or removed by CN and CP over the years. Operations through Niagara Falls (and over the MCRR bridge) were discontinued with that portion of the line through the city removed in 2001. Unlike the rest of the line, however, the Detroit River tunnel is a key part of freight movements across the Canada-US border and still sees a good number of mainline trains. 
 
The CASO rarely operated its own rolling stock after acquisition, and its reporting mark was abolished in 1977.

See also 

 New York Central 1290 and 1291
 Canada Southern Railway Station
 List of Ontario railways
 List of defunct Canadian railways

Notes

References

Further reading

External links 

 
 
 St Thomas

Railroads transferred to Conrail
Canadian Pacific Railway subsidiaries
Canadian National Railway subsidiaries
Defunct New York (state) railroads
Defunct Michigan railroads
Defunct Ontario railways
Railroads controlled by the Vanderbilt family
Defunct locomotive manufacturers of Canada
Rail transport in Windsor, Ontario
History of rail transport in Essex County, Ontario
Rail transport in Chatham-Kent
History of rail transport in Elgin County
Rail transport in St. Thomas, Ontario
History of rail transport in Oxford County, Ontario
Rail transport in Norfolk County, Ontario
History of Norfolk County, Ontario
Haldimand County
History of rail transport in the Regional Municipality of Niagara
Rail transport in Welland
Transport in Fort Erie, Ontario
Standard gauge railways in Canada